Carlos Manuel Salgado Costa (born 8 November 1966) is a Portuguese football player and later manager.

He played 9 seasons and 282 games in the Primeira Liga for Farense and Beira-Mar.

Club career
He made his Primeira Liga debut for Beira-Ma on 22 August 1993 in a game against Estoril.

References

1966 births
Living people
Sportspeople from Coimbra
Portuguese footballers
C.D. Feirense players
S.C. Beira-Mar players
Primeira Liga players
S.C. Farense players
Liga Portugal 2 players
Portuguese football managers
S.C. Farense managers
Association football midfielders